Lisa Ross is a photographer.

Her work has been exhibited in galleries and museums including the Rubin Museum in New York City and Fotografiska Museum in Stockholm. Her work has been reviewed in the New York Times, Artforum, and The New Yorker, among others.  A monograph was published to accompany her solo exhibition at the Rubin Museum in 2013, and was reviewed by The New York Review of Books.

References

External links

Living people
People from New York City
American women photographers
Sarah Lawrence College alumni
Columbia University School of the Arts alumni
Year of birth missing (living people)
21st-century American women